The electoral district of Narre Warren South is an electorate of the Victorian Legislative Assembly, containing the suburbs of Cranbourne North, Hampton Park, Lynbrook and Narre Warren South.

The seat has only been in existence since the 2002 election. Dale Wilson was the inaugural sitting member, but he was defeated by Tim Holding staffer Judith Graley in a preselection battle in early 2006. Graley then defeated Liberal candidate Michael Shepherdson at the 2006 election.

Members for Narre Warren South

Election results

References

External links
 Electorate profile: Narre Warren South, Victorian Electoral Commission

2002 establishments in Australia
Electoral districts of Victoria (Australia)
City of Casey
Electoral districts and divisions of Greater Melbourne